Multiple governmental agencies and private businesses have imposed or attempted to impose bans on the social media service TikTok. Countries like India and the United States have expressed concerns about the app's ownership by the Chinese company, ByteDance, attempting to ban it from app stores. Countries such as Indonesia and Bangladesh have banned it on the basis of pornography-related concerns, while others like Armenia and Azerbaijan have implemented restrictions to mitigate the spread of information which could lead to conflict. Syria has banned it allegedly due to human trafficking into Europe and other countries via its shared border with Turkey.

Asia

Afghanistan
In April 2022, a spokesman for the Taliban government stated that the app will be banned for 'misleading the younger generation' and that TikTok's content was 'not consistent with Islamic laws'.

Armenia 
In October 2020, TikTok users in Armenia reported a loss of app functionality, although it has not been confirmed whether this was the result of any intervention by the Armenian government in response to the use of the app by Azerbaijani sources to spread misinformation during the 2020 Nagorno-Karabakh conflict.

Azerbaijan 
On 27 September 2020, citizens of Azerbaijan noticed social media restrictions across an array of platforms, including TikTok, Facebook, Twitter, LinkedIn, YouTube, and others. NetBlocks confirmed the restrictions on social media and communication platforms through Twitter. According to Azerbaijan's Ministry of Transport, Communications and Technology, these restriction were issued in an attempt to "prevent large-scale provocations from Armenia," during the longstanding Nagorno-Karabakh conflict.

Bangladesh 
In November 2018, the Bangladeshi government blocked the TikTok app's Internet access as part of Bangladesh's crackdown on the removal of pornography and gambling sites. "I want to create a safe and secure internet for all Bangladeshis, including children. And this is my war against pornography. And this will be a continuous war," said Mustafa Jabbar, Posts and Communications Officer of Bangladesh.

In August 2020, the government of Bangladesh requested that TikTok remove 10 videos from the platform that were uploaded from the country. "The TikTok authorities have told the government they will take down 'offensive' videos uploaded from Bangladesh," said the Minister of Post and Telecommunication of Bangladesh. As a result, the Bangladeshi government cleared the TikTok ban.

In June 2021, Law and Life Foundation, a human rights organization, issued a legal notice to the Bangladeshi government that sought the prohibition of "dangerous and harmful" applications such as TikTok, PUBG, and Free Fire, but failed to obtain a response. Soon thereafter, Law and Life Foundation's lawyers filed a petition with the High Court, sharing the organization's concerns. In August 2020, the High Court encouraged the Bangladeshi government to prohibit "dangerous and harmful" applications such as TikTok, PUBG, and Free Fire to "save children and adolescents from moral and social degradation."

India

2019 ban 
On 3 April 2019, the Madras High Court, while hearing a PIL, asked the Government of India to ban the app, citing that it "encourages pornography" and shows "inappropriate content". The court also noted that minors using the app were at risk of being targeted by sexual predators. The court further asked broadcast media not to telecast any of those videos from the app. The spokesperson for TikTok stated that they were abiding by local laws and were awaiting the copy of the court order before they take action. On 17 April, both Google and Apple removed TikTok from Google Play and the App Store. As the court refused to reconsider the ban, the company stated that they had removed over 6 million videos that violated their content policy and guidelines.

On 25 April 2019, the ban was lifted after the Madras High Court reversed its order, following a plea from TikTok developer ByteDance Technology. "We are committed to continuously enhancing our safety features as a testament to our ongoing commitment to our users in India," said TikTok in an official media statement. India's TikTok ban might have cost the app 15 million new users.

2020 ban 
TikTok, along with 58 other Chinese-created apps, was banned completely in India by the Ministry of Electronics and Information Technology on 29 June 2020, with a statement saying they were "prejudicial to sovereignty and integrity of India, defence of India, security of state and public order". The ban was in response to a military clash between Indian and Chinese troops in disputed territory along their shared border between Ladakh and Western China. After an earlier skirmish in 2017 between the militaries of the two most populous countries in the world, the Indian military demanded that its troops delete dozens of Chinese applications from their devices over national security concerns. Applications like Weibo, UC Browser, and Shareit are among the apps that were deleted at that time and have now been completely banned.

The Indian government said the decision to ban the apps was "to protect the data and privacy of its 1.3 billion citizens" and to put a stop to technology that was "stealing and surreptitiously transmitting users' data in unauthorized servers outside India". Dev Khare, a partner at the venture firm Lightspeed India said that although India's app ban was a populist "feel-good" step, he did not see it as a bad thing because "it's something that China did a long time ago" and "the rest of the world has the right to do it to China."

Indonesia 
On 3 July 2018, TikTok was temporarily banned in Indonesia after the Indonesian government accused it of promulgating "pornography, inappropriate content, and blasphemy." Rudiantra, Indonesia's Minister of Communications and Information said, "The app has a lot of negative and harmful content, especially for children," and added that, "Once TikTok can give us guarantees they can maintain clean content, it can re-open." TikTok quickly responded by promising to enlist 20 staff to censor TikTok content in Indonesia, and the ban was lifted eight days later.

Iran
Iranians cannot access TikTok because of both TikTok's rules and Iranian censorship.

Jordan
On December 17, 2022, Jordan announced a temporary ban against TikTok, following the death of a police officer during clashes with protesters. On December 23, local media outlets in Jordan reported that the platform was back to normal, following its six day suspension.

Pakistan 
Over the 15 months up to November 2021, the Pakistan Telecommunication Authority (PTA) imposed and lifted four bans on TikTok.

In October 2020, Pakistan ordered a ban of TikTok over "immoral, obscene, and vulgar" content. The ban was reversed ten days later, after ByteDance stated that they would remove objectionable TikTok content and block users who upload "pornography and paedo content".

In March 2021, a provincial court, the Peshawar High Court Order responded to a petition made by a resident of Punjab. The petition stated that TikTok's platform was being used to promote crime and glorified the use of drugs and weapons in its short videos and called on the PTA to ban the app once again. According to Sara Ali Khan, legal representative of the Punjab resident, the PTA announced that TikTok had not adequately proven their ability to moderate "immoral" and "indecent" content. Even with the removal of over 6 million videos between January 2021 and March 2021, the PTA remained unsatisfied and banned the app outright. The PTA lifted the ban in April 2021 after TikTok assured them it would "filter and moderate content".

On 28 June 2021, the Sindh High Court Order urged the PTA to restore the ban on TikTok for the alleged "spreading of immorality and obscenity". On 30 June 2021, the PTA announced that it had once more blocked citizen's access to the video-sharing application. Three days later, the court withdrew its decision.

On 20 July 2021, the PTA instituted a ban on TikTok by reason of the "continuous presence of inappropriate content on the platform and its failure to take such content down." According to a statement by the PTA, "As a result of continuous engagement, senior management of the platform assured (the) PTA of its commitment to take necessary measure to control unlawful content in accordance with local laws and societal norms." Consequently, on 19 November 2021, the PTA agreed to act promptly and once again backtrack and eliminate Pakistan's fourth ban on TikTok. The PTA said in a tweet that they "will continue to monitor the platform in order to ensure that unlawful content contrary to Pakistan's law and societal values is not disseminated."

Taiwan 
In 2022, Taiwanese authorities banned TikTok from public sector devices over concerns of usage by the Chinese government to conduct "cognitive warfare" against Taiwan.

Europe
In February 2023, the European Commission and European Council banned TikTok from official devices. French President Emmanuel Macron has called the app "deceptively innocent" and reportedly spoke of his desire to regulate the app, when visiting the United States in November 2022.

Belgium 
In March 2023, Belgium banned TikTok from all federal government work devices over cybersecurity, privacy, and misinformation concerns.

Denmark 
In March 2023, Denmark's Ministry of Defence banned TikTok on work devices.

Latvia 
In March 2023, Latvian Ministry of Foreign Affairs banned TikTok on work devices citing security reasons.

The Netherlands 
In November 2022, the Dutch Ministry of General Affairs advised government personnel to "suspend the use of TikTok for the government until TikTok has adjusted its data protection policy."

United Kingdom 
In March 2023, the UK government announced that TikTok would be banned on electronic devices used by ministers and other employees, amid security concerns relating to the app's handling of user data.

North America

Canada
In February 2023, following a review of TikTok from the Chief Information Officer of Canada, the Canadian government banned the app on all government-issued devices.

Shortly thereafter, the provincial and territorial governments of Alberta, British Columbia, Manitoba, New Brunswick, Newfoundland and Labrador, Northwest Territories, Nova Scotia, Nunavut, Ontario, Prince Edward Island, Quebec, and Saskatchewan banned the app on government-issued devices.

United States

Trump administration 

In 2020, the U.S. government announced that it was considering banning the Chinese social media platform TikTok upon a request from then-U.S. president Donald Trump, who viewed the app as a national security threat. The result was that TikTok owner ByteDance—which initially planned on selling a small portion of TikTok to an American company—agreed to divest TikTok to prevent a ban in the United States and in other countries where restrictions are also being considered due to privacy concerns, which themselves are mostly related to its ownership by a firm based in China.

TikTok would later announce plans to file legal action challenging the order's transactional prohibitions with U.S. companies. The lawsuit against the Trump administration's order was filed on August 24, and contended that the administration's order was motivated by Trump's efforts to boost re-election support through protectionist trade policies aimed at China. A separate suit filed the same day by TikTok's U.S. technical program manager Patrick Ryan against Trump and Secretary of Commerce Wilbur Ross sought a temporary restraining order (TRO), arguing that his due process rights were violated and the ban was an "unconstitutional taking" of Ryan's property under the Fifth Amendment; the suit also claimed Trump's action was likely a retaliation because of the TikTok pranks targeting the June 20 campaign rally.

American technology company Microsoft had previously proposed an idea to acquire TikTok's algorithm and other artificial intelligence technology, but this was declined by ByteDance, as its executives expressed concern that it would likely be opposed by the Chinese government, which criticized the Trump administration's order previously as a "smash and grab" forced sale and (on September 13, 2021) suggested it would prefer the shuttering of U.S. operations over such a sale.

Biden administration 

On 9 June 2021, the Biden Administration issued Executive Order 14034, "Protecting Americans' Sensitive Data from Foreign Adversaries" ("EO 14034").  EO 14034, overturning three Executive Orders signed by Donald Trump: Executive Order 13942, Executive Order 13943, and Executive Order 13971. Despite these Executive Orders now being revoked, the Biden Administration's EO 14304 has called upon additional federal agencies to continue a broad review of foreign-owned applications which are set to continuously inform the President on the risk that the applications pose to personal data and national security. The White House said in a statement that, "The Biden Administration is committed to promoting an open, interoperable, reliable, and secure Internet; protecting human rights online and offline; and supporting a vibrant, global digital economy."

On 30 December 2022, President Joe Biden approved the No TikTok on Government Devices Act, prohibiting the use of the app on devices owned by the federal government, with some exceptions.

U.S. states

As of February 2023, at least 32 (of 50) states have announced or enacted bans on state government agencies, employees, and contractors using TikTok on government-issued devices. State bans only affect government employees and do not prohibit civilians from having or using the app on their personal devices.

Days after the Biden administration called on ByteDance, which owns TikTok to sell the platform or face a ban, law enforcement officials disclosed that an investigation into TikTok was taking place. On 17 March 2023 the FBI and US Justice Department officially launched an investigation of TikTok, including allegations that the company spied on American journalists.

Universities
Following state bans, some public universities have also opted to ban TikTok on campus Wi-Fi and university-owned computers. These include, but are not limited to:

 Arkansas State University
 Arkansas Tech University
 Auburn University
 Black Hills State University
 Boise State University
 Dakota State University
 Idaho State University
 Iowa State University
 Lamar University
 Langston University
 Montana University System
 Morgan State University
 Northeastern State University
 Northern State University
 Northwestern Oklahoma State University
 Oklahoma State University
 South Dakota School of Mines and Technology
 South Dakota State University
 Texas A&M University system
 Texas State Technical College
 Texas State University
 Texas Tech University System
 University of Florida
 University of Houston System
 University of Idaho
 University of Iowa
 University of Northern Iowa
 University of Oklahoma
 University of South Dakota
 University of Texas at Austin
 University of Wisconsin System
 University System of Georgia
 West Texas A&M University

Public opinion
A July 2020 poll from Morning Consult, with 2,200 surveyed, found that 29% of American adults supported a TikTok ban, 33% opposed one, and 38% had no opinion. An August 2020 poll from Reuters/Ipsos, surveying 1,349, had 40% supporting Trump's move to ban the app, 30% opposed, and 30% uncertain.

A December 2022 poll from Rasmussen Reports, surveying 1,000 likely U.S. voters, found that 68% supported proposals to federally ban TikTok, with 43% strongly supporting a ban. Conversely, 24% surveyed were opposed, including 12% who strongly opposed.

Oceania

Australia
On 7 March 2023, the Canberra Times reported that 68 Australian federal agencies had banned TikTok on work-related mobile devices. Liberal Party Senator James Paterson called for a federal ban on all government-related devices.

Some state governments have considered banning the app on official government devices. On 14 March 2023, New South Wales was the first state to consider a ban on the app, followed by Western Australia three days later.

On 21 March 2023, the federal government began a review of the app. The review is expected to ban TikTok on all official government devices. It has been reported that some politicians are using burner phones due to the ban.

New Zealand 
On 17 March 2023, the New Zealand Parliamentary Service banned TikTok on devices connected to Parliament, citing cybersecurity concerns and advice from the Government Communications Security Bureau (GCSB), the country's signals intelligence agency. The GCSB's Minister Andrew Little had initially ruled out a ban on TikTok.

References 

TikTok
TikTok
TikTok
Internet censorship in India